Jeff Geiser (born February 25, 1953) is a former American football coach.  He was the 17th head football coach at Adams State College—now known as Adams State University—in Alamosa, Colorado and he held that position for 13 seasons, from 1984 until 1996.  His coaching record at Adams State was 65–68–2.

Head coaching record

References

1943 births
Living people
Adams State Grizzlies football coaches